Tall-e Kushk (also Romanized as Tall-e Kūshk, Tol-e Kūshak, and Tol-e Kūshk; also known as Tal-e Gūk, Tal-e Kūk, Tol-e Kūsh, Tol-Kucak, and Tul Gowak) is a village in Anarestan Rural District, Chenar Shahijan District, Kazerun County, Fars Province, Iran. At the 2006 census, its population was 1,413, in 299 families.

References 

Populated places in Chenar Shahijan County